Bou is both a surname and a given name. Notable people with the name include:

Bou Minisuka (born 1983), ex-guitarist An Cafe
Antoni Bou (born 1987), World Motorcycle Trials Champion
Bou Hmara (circa 1860–1909), pretender to the throne of Morocco
Gabrielle Bou Rached (born 1986), former Miss Lebanon
Gustavo Bou (born 1990), Argentinian footballer

Fictional characters:
Bou Keng Wan, one of the two main characters in the manhua series Fung Wan
Bou Tin, a supporting character in the manhua series Fung Wan

Masculine given names